George Burwell Ward (November 6, 1878 – January 22, 1942) was an American player and coach of college football, and a lawyer in Connecticut.

Biography

Ward graduated from Yale University in 1902 and Yale Law School in 1904. At Yale, he lettered in hockey, football and baseball; he was a member of the Yale football teams of 1899 and 1900. The 1900 team finished with a 12–0 record and was retroactively named as the national champion. He was a member of Zeta Psi fraternity.

Ward served as the head football coach of the New Hampshire football team at New Hampshire College of Agriculture and the Mechanic Arts in Durham, New Hampshire, in 1904. The college would become the University of New Hampshire in 1923 and would adopt the Wildcats nickname in 1926. Ward compiled a coaching record of 2–5.

Ward began practicing law in Connecticut in 1905, first in Hartford until 1917, and later in Bristol from 1926 until shortly before his death in 1942.

Head coaching record

References

External links

1878 births
1942 deaths
19th-century players of American football
Connecticut lawyers
New Hampshire Wildcats football coaches
Yale Bulldogs baseball players
Yale Bulldogs football players
Yale Bulldogs men's ice hockey players
People from Bristol, Connecticut
Players of American football from Connecticut
Yale Law School alumni